Dreamer is the fourth and final album by the Jazz fusion group Caldera.

Track listing 
 "To Capture the Moon" (Eduardo del Barrio) – 5:00
 "Rain Forest" (Jorge Strunz) – 8:06
 "Dream Child" (Eduardo del Barrio) – 5:12
 "Celebration" (George del Barrio) – 4:35
 "Reflections on Don Quixote" (Eduardo del Barrio) – 7:11
 "Brujerias" (Eduardo del Barrio, Jorge Strunz) – 6:02
 "Himalaya" (Jorge Strunz) – 7:04

Personnel
 Jorge Strunz — acoustic guitar, electric guitar, chant
 Eduardo del Barrio — acoustic piano, electric piano, Oberheim Polyphonic, Mini Moog, Prophet 5 synthesizers, percussion, chant (on 7), palmas (on 6)
 Steve Tavaglione — alto saxophone, soprano saxophone, flute, bamboo flute
 Mike Azeredo — congas, percussion
 Greg Lee — electric bass
 Luis Conte — congas, timbales, batá, chant
 Alex Acuña — drums, batá

Guests
 George del Barrio — Fender Rhodes (track 4 only)
 Dean Cortez — bass (track 7 only)
 Gino D'Anri — flamenco guitar (track 6 only)
 Antonio Sanchez — palmas (track 6 only)
 Ernesto Herrera — palmas (track 6 only)
 Kathlyn Powell — Celtic harp (track 7 only)

References

1979 albums
1995 albums
Caldera (band) albums
Capitol Records albums
Reissue albums